Kestigia (also kestigie, kestighie or kestigade) is a verb, mentioned in medieval Frisian texts. It was a legal process in which a defendant had to prove his innocence by providing an oath. The historian R. P. Cleveringa calls it a 'technical evidence law concept'. The texts in which the term is found dated between the twelfth, thirteenth and fourteenth centuries.

References

Law of the Netherlands
Frisian languages
Medieval Netherlands